Bernard Lazarus Nyoni Mkhabela  was the second bishop of Swaziland.

References 

Anglican bishops of Swaziland
Year of birth missing
Year of death missing